Gao Feng (Simplified Chinese: 高峰) (born 22 April 1971) is a Chinese former international footballer who played as a striker for Beijing Guoan, Qianwei Huandao, Shenyang Sealion before retiring with Tianjin TEDA. In his personal life was also married to Chinese vocalist Na Ying and had a son together, but the couple divorced in 2005.

Biography
Gao Feng started his football career playing for the Beijing Football Team until the 1994 league season saw full professionism within the league and the club renamed themselves Beijing Guoan. Throughout his time at Beijing, Gao showed a highly efficient goal scoring ability with excellent stamina, which saw him as their first choice striker when they won the 1996 Chinese FA Cup. His goal-scoring ability soon saw him be included in the Chinese national team and he was called up to the team that went to the 1996 AFC Asian Cup, where China were knocked out in the quarter-finals against Saudi Arabia on December 16, 1996 in a 4-3 defeat. By the 1997 league season he transferred to top tier side Qianwei Huandao and was part of the team that gained mid-table mediocrity. By the 1999 league season he was also part of the team that decided to move to Chongqing and renamed themselves Chongqing Longxin before transferring to Shenyang Sealion and then Tianjin TEDA, where he retired.

Gao Feng took part in the Chinese version of Dancing with the Stars in 2014. On March 9, 2015, Gao Feng was arrested after an assault on a taxi driver.

International goals

Honours
Beijing Guoan
Chinese FA Cup: 1996

References

External links
 Gao Feng's Blog
 Database on SODASOCCER.com 
 

1971 births
Living people
Footballers from Shenyang
Chinese footballers
China international footballers
1996 AFC Asian Cup players
Beijing Guoan F.C. players
Chongqing Liangjiang Athletic F.C. players
Changsha Ginde players
Tianjin Jinmen Tiger F.C. players
Asian Games silver medalists for China
Medalists at the 1994 Asian Games
Asian Games medalists in football
Association football forwards
Footballers at the 1994 Asian Games